EnergyAustralia was a state–owned enterprise of the Government of New South Wales, Australia.  It was electricity and gas supplier and retailer which primarily supplied the Sydney, Newcastle and Central Coast areas of New South Wales. Since market deregulation, it increased its focus on retail supply opportunities in electricity and gas to the Victorian market and electricity in the deregulated south–east corner of Queensland.

History

EnergyAustralia has origins over 100 years old, and was formed after a merger in 1996 between Orion Energy (formerly Shortland Electricity and Shortland County Council) and Sydney Electricity (formerly Sydney County Council, Mackellar County Council and St George County Council).

In 2011, EnergyAustralia's retail business and company name was sold to TRUEnergy. In 2012, TRUEnergy adapted the name EnergyAustralia. The distribution business remained a state government enterprise and was renamed Ausgrid. 

Energy Australia has been a wholly owned subsidiary of Hong Kong-based China Light and Power Co Ltd since 2011

Operations
The company had a price-regulated monopoly for the supply of electricity to its supply area. The residential energy market was deregulated in 1997 and full retail contestability introduced in 2002.

EnergyAustralia owned an electricity distribution network in addition to its retail activities. The electricity distribution network covered most of the eastern parts of Sydney, Central Coast and Hunter regions, with the Integral Energy distribution network covering most parts of Western Sydney.

EnergyAustralia owned its own metering services company Testing & Certification Australia, an accredited metering provider, providing contestable metering services to all energy retailers. TCA also includes a high power facility at Lane Cove, a NATA registered instrument calibration facility and was involved in electrical safety compliance testing of appliances until this division was closed in 2010, with the capability being sold to Vipac Engineers and Scientists Pty Ltd. The metering services, Lane Cove High Power Testing Station and instrument calibration facility were later rebranded to PLUS ES.

EnergyAustralia also offered customers the choice of renewable green power which produces no green house gas emissions and is accredited by the National GreenPower Accreditation Program.

References

External links

About EnergyAustralia
PLUS ES

Government-owned companies of New South Wales
Electric power companies of Australia